Körfuknattleiksfélag Selfoss, commonly known as Selfoss-Basket (Icelandic: Selfoss-Karfa), is a basketball club in Selfoss, Iceland. Its men's team currently plays in the 1. deild karla.

History
The club was founded on August 24, 2005 as Íþróttafélag FSu (English: FSu Sports Club). In 2012 it changed its name to Körfuknattleiksfélag FSu (English: FSu Basket) and on April 5, 2018, the club changed its name again to Körfuknattleiksfélag Selfoss (English: Selfoss Basketball Club), or Selfoss-Karfa (English: Selfoss-Basket) for short.

Men's basketball
In 2008, FSu gained promotion to the Úrvalsdeild karla after beating Valur in the 1. deild karla promotion playoffs. It played in the Úrvalsdeild until 2010, when it was relegated back to 1. deild. In 2015, FSu beat Hamar in the promotion playoffs and gained promotion to the Úrvalsdeild karla for the second time in its history. During the 2015–16 Úrvalsdeild karla season they posted a 3-19 record, finishing second-to-last in the league and were relegated back to 1. deild. In February 2021, the team made an affiliation deal with Real Betis.

Notable players

Coaches
 Brynjar Karl Sigurðsson 2005–2009
 Rob Newson 2009–2010
 Valur Ingimundarson 2010–2011
 Kjartan Atli Kjartansson 2011–2012
 Erik Olson 2012–2016
 Eloy Doce Chambrelan 2016–2017
 Karl Ágúst Hannibalsson 2017–2018
 Chris Caird 2018–present

Women's basketball
The club fielded a joint women's team with neighbouring club Hrunamenn in the second-tier 1. deild kvenna, under the name FSu/Hrunamenn, from 2013 to 2015.

Coaches
Karl Ágúst Hannibalsson 2013–2014
Collin Pryor 2014–2015

References

External links
Official site
Team profile on kki.is

Basketball teams in Iceland
Selfoss